The Gold Dredge, near La Grange, California, also known as the Tuolumne Gold Dredging Company Dredge, was built in 1937.  It was listed on the National Register of Historic Places in 1971.

It was designed and built by Walter W. Johnson, who later bought the dredge himself.

References

Gold dredges
National Register of Historic Places in Stanislaus County, California
Buildings and structures completed in 1937